Esko Kalervo Vaartela (until 1935 Vilkman) (1927 – 1983) was a Finnish diplomat, a master of political science. She was Chief Consul General and Commercial Representative in East Berlin 1969–1973 and Ambassador 1973–1974, Secretary of State for Foreign Affairs 1974–1979 and Ambassador in Sofia 1979–1983.

Vaartela began her career as Head of the Statistical Office of Finland 1950–1951, then served as Secretary of State for Foreign Affairs in 1952–1954, Assistant to the Ministry of Foreign Affairs 1954–1956, Deputy Assistant Secretary for Foreign Affairs 1956–1958, Second Division Secretary of State in Bern 1958–1960, Secretary for Foreign Affairs 1960–1962 Secretary of State in Copenhagen 1962–1964 and Head of Department of the Ministry of Foreign Affairs 1965–1969.

Ambassadors of Finland to East Germany
Ambassadors of Finland to Bulgaria
Finnish women ambassadors
1927 births
1983 deaths